Sestroretsk is a Russian women's road bicycle racing team, established in 2020, which participates in elite women's races.

After the 2022 Russian invasion of Ukraine, the UCI said that Russian teams are forbidden from competing in international events.

National champions
2021
 Russia Road Race, Seda Krylova

References

External links

UCI Women's Teams
Cycling teams based in Russia
Cycling teams established in 2020